"Yi Jian Mei", also commonly referred to by its popular lyrics "Xue hua piao piao bei feng xiao xiao" (lit. "Snowflakes drifting, the north wind whistling"), is a 1983 Mandopop song by Taiwanese singer Fei Yu-ching, first released on his 1983 album Water of the Yangtze River. A new version was released on Fei's 2010 album Boundless Love.

Widely regarded as the signature song of Fei's music career, "Yi Jian Mei" is a melancholic love song using winter plum blossoms as an analogy for enduring love through hardship. It has been a popular song in Greater China since the 1980s and is considered a timeless classic. It was used as the theme song for the eponymous 1984 Taiwanese drama One Plum Blossom, produced by China Television.

Background
Fei Yu-ching's 1983 Mandarin-language album Water of the Yangtze River first included the song, which was originally planned as the theme song of a Taiwanese TV drama series entitled Dreaming Back to the Border Town. Even though the series was ultimately not released, the song was instead adopted as the theme song for the 1984 Taiwanese TV drama One Plum Blossom, and thus it was popularized among Taiwanese people.

In 1988, One Plum Blossom aired on CCTV, which boosted the popularity of both the song and Fei himself in Mainland China; the song was reused as the theme song for New One Plum Blossom, a 2009 Chinese remake version of the 1983 TV series, starring Wallace Huo.

In 2019, the Beijing-based Taiwanese singer  performed the song at a Mid-Autumn Festival concert organized by CCTV. In the same year, Fei, who earlier announced his formal retirement, held farewell concerts in various places and performed the song in his final show at Taipei Arena on 7 November.

Internet popularity
In early 2020, a selfie phone video clip of a man with an egg-shaped head featuring the song became viral, leading to it being shared in thousands of internet memes and spawning various cover videos across the internet.

The video was originally posted in January 2020 on the video sharing application Kuaishou by Beijing-based actor/director Zhang Aiqin, who filmed himself singing the famous verse somewhat off-tune while walking alone in a park covered by heavy snow. Zhang is known for having a bald and oddly egg-shaped head, which has gained him the nickname "Eggman" or "Duck Egg". His username on Kuaishou is "Brother Egg".

In May, the song reached international audiences and became a meme on the video sharing app TikTok. This propelled the song to the top spots on the Spotify Viral 50 chart in countries like Norway, Sweden, Finland, and New Zealand.

The song is commonly referred to as "Xue Hua Piao Piao Bei Feng Xiao Xiao", which is the part of the song that gained the most prominence. The popularity of the internet meme caused official versions of "Yi Jian Mei" on music streaming services like YouTube Music to change the name of the song to include "xue hua piao piao bei feng xiao xiao" following the official name.

Fei Yu-ching, who retired in November 2019, has stated that he is both flattered and honored by the song's sudden international popularity, but also emphasized that he has already retired and will not return to the Mandopop scene.

Notes

References

External links
 Original title sequence of China Television's One Plum Blossom (1984) with the theme song, "Yi Jian Mei", on YouTube

1983 songs
1983 singles
Taiwanese songs
Internet memes introduced in 2020
Mandarin-language songs
Television drama theme songs
Songs about flowers
Torch songs